The Michigan Line, sometimes known as the Chicago–Detroit Line, is a higher-speed rail corridor that runs between Porter, Indiana and Dearborn, Michigan. It carries Amtrak's Blue Water and Wolverine services, as well as the occasional freight train operated by Norfolk Southern.

Amtrak owns the  section between Porter, Indiana, to Kalamazoo, Michigan, the longest stretch of Amtrak-owned rail outside of the Northeastern U.S. The state of Michigan, through the Michigan Department of Transportation (MDOT) owns the  section between Kalamazoo and Dearborn, which it purchased from Norfolk Southern in December 2012. Norfolk Southern retains an exclusive trackage right for freight on the line. A short stretch of track in Battle Creek, Michigan is owned by Canadian National Railway. The entire line was originally the mainline of the Michigan Central Railroad.

History 
In 2002, the section from Porter to Kalamazoo became the first passenger rail line in the United States to have positive train control (PTC) technology installed, specifically GE Transportation Systems' Incremental Train Control System (ITCS). Most Amtrak trains outside of the Northeast are limited to  due to federal regulations. Regular service at  began from Porter to Kalamazoo on February 15, 2012.

In November 2011, Michigan was awarded $150 million to upgrade its rail line to allow speeds of up to  along the rest of the line from Kalamazoo to Dearborn, for a total 77% of the routes of Amtrak's Wolverine and Blue Water services between Detroit and Chicago.

Incidents 
Despite the presence of the safety system on the Michigan Line, a derailment occurred just east of Niles, Michigan, on October 21, 2012, after a Wolverine train exited the main line and entered a freight yard due to a misaligned switch. The train had a green signal and was traveling at about  when it hit the switch. The incident was investigated by the National Transportation Safety Board and was found to be an Amtrak contractor's fault, caused by one of its employees improperly applying jumper wires to the signal system, bypassing safeguards that had been designed to prevent such an occurrence.

References

Notes

External links 

 
Passenger rail transportation in Michigan
Passenger rail transportation in Indiana
Railway lines in the United States
Rail infrastructure in Michigan
Rail infrastructure in Indiana